China Development Financial Holding Co., Ltd. (CDF) is a Financial Holding Corporation in Taiwan. It mainly does business with its key subsidiaries the CDIB Capital Group, KGI Securities, KGI Bank and China Life.

Development history 
In 1959, China Development Corporation was established. The first private development financial institution in Taiwan was established through the collective efforts of the Economic Stabilization Committee of the Executive Yuan, the World Bank, and private capital as Taiwan's first privately run financial institution focusing on direct investments.

In 1999, China Development Corporation was restructured as an industrial bank. Renowned for direct investment service, China Development Industrial Bank had continued its way to support local industry.

In December 2001 the China Development Industrial Bank (CDIB) established the CDF by way of a stock swap. On November 8, 2002, the Grand Cathay Securities Corporation and Elite Securities became subsidiaries of CDF through a stock swap. On December 31, 2003, CDF merged Grand Cathay Securities and Elite Securities.

In 2005, CDF planned to acquire Jinding Securities, however CDF was not able to get Jinding Securities' original management team to agree. After four years of continuing to buy stocks, in 2009 CDF had finally held a 48% stake in Jingding Securities, but following five years of controversy CDF was ultimately unable to merge with Jingding Securities.

In 2012, CDF publicly acquired the second largest securities firm in Taiwan, KGI Securities, for NT$54.6 billion, with the largest merger in the history of Taiwan. KGI was acquired at NT$5.5 per share cash at a 1.2 to 1 exchange rate. The exchange was complete on January 18, 2013, and CDF acquired 100% of the stock rights for KGI. On June 22 of that same year, KGI Securities merged with Grand Cathay Securities Corporation with KGI being the surviving company.

In June 2013, KGI Securities merged with Grand Cathay Securities, another subsidiary within CDF. After the business integration of its two major securities companies, it has become the leader of domestic investment banks, bonds and new financial products.

In 2014, CDF acquired Cosmos Bank as a subsidiary at the cost of NT$23.09 billion, and in 2015 Cosmos Bank became known as “KGI Commercial Bank”. From this point on, CDIB's Corporate Finances and Financial Markets were ceded to KGI Commercial Bank.

In March 2017, CDIB transformed into CDIB Capital Group in March 2017. Continuing the core of Industrial Bank, CDIB Capital Group is committed to private equity investment funds and actively expand asset management business.

In September 2017, China Life became an integral part of the group.

In April 2021, CDF committed net zero carbon emissions by 2045

In October 2021, CDF convened an extraordinary shareholders’ meeting and approves the acquisition of all remaining China Life stock.

In October 2021, CDF completed the move to its new headquarters on the 20th anniversary of the holding company.

See also
 List of companies of Taiwan

References

2001 establishments in Taiwan
Companies listed on the Taiwan Stock Exchange
Companies based in Taipei
Financial services companies established in 2001